Marcello Mazzarella (born 18 October 1963) is an Italian actor. He appeared in more than sixty films since 1990.

Selected filmography

References

External links 

1963 births
Living people
People from Erice
Italian male film actors